The Mayor of Copeland is a directly elected mayoralty, first elected on 7 May 2015, taking on the executive function of Copeland Borough Council in Cumbria, England. The current mayor is Mike Starkie, elected as an independent candidate in 2015 and 2019 but later joining the Conservative Party.

Referendum
A petition to change the status of the borough from one with a leader and cabinet to one with an executive mayor was submitted in February 2014. On 22 May 2014, a referendum was held (concurrent with elections to the European Parliament), at which voters opted to change to a mayoral system.

2015 election
The election was initially planned for October 2014, but this was later delayed to May 2015 to save money. The contest took place on the same day as the election of borough councillors and the UK general election.

2019 election

References

Copeland